Jay Stone (born 31 December 1979) is a track and field sprint athlete who competes as a Masters athlete for Australia.

Stone is also a successful athletics coach.

References

External links

 Jay Stone iCoach Profile

1979 births
Living people
Australian male sprinters